The 2019 Fiji Senior League was the second-highest division within the Fiji football league system after the Fiji Premier League in Fiji Senior League (Vodafone Senior League for sponsorship reasons). It is currently contested by 12 teams with two groups of 6 teams and is ran and overseen by the Fiji Football Association in Fiji.

Teams
A total of twelve teams compete in the league in two groups of six teams each

Viti Levu Zone 
Lami 
Nadroga 
Navua 
Northland Tailevu 
Rakiraki 
Tailevu Naitasiri

Vanua Levu Zone  
Bua 
Dreketi  
Nadogo  
Seaqaqa  
Savusavu  
Taveuni

League table

Viti Levu Zone

Vanua Levu Zone

Results 

Viti Levu Zone

Vanua Levu Zone

Play-Offs
The play-offs are played between the top two of each group. The winner is promoted to  2020 Fiji Premier League

Results

Top scorers

See also 
 2019 Fiji Premier League
 2019 Inter-District Championship
 2019 Inter-District Championship - Senior Division
 2019 Fiji Battle of the Giants
 2019 Fiji Football Association Cup Tournament

References

External links

Football leagues in Fiji
Fiji
Senior League